The 1967 New Zealand rugby union tour of Great Britain, France and Canada was a tour undertaken by the New Zealand national rugby union team (the All Blacks). The series consisted of 17 matches, four of Test status against international opposition. The New Zealand team finished the tour undefeated, the first time they had achieved this in the Northern hemisphere since the 1924–25 Invincible team.

Tour 
The 1967 tour was hastily arranged, as New Zealand originally intended to tour South Africa. That was called off due to apartheid issues over the Māori members of the New Zealand side, and Britain was chosen as an alternative. This resulted in difficulties arranging matches against club opposition, a tradition of earlier tours, with non-Test games now played solely against regional teams.

The tour captain was Brian Lochore and the 30-man team was managed by former Kiwis' captain Charles Saxton. The tour began in North America, where the All Blacks played two matches, against British Columbia and Eastern Canada. The tourists then travelled to Great Britain where they faced several regional teams along with two Test matches against England and Wales. This was followed by four matches in France, one against the French national team, before returning to Britain to play three games in Scotland, where they played the final Test of the tour against Scotland. They completed the tour with a return to Wales, beating Monmouthshire and then drawing against an East Wales team, before the final fixture against the Barbarians.

The All Blacks should also have played matches in Ireland, including a test match against Ireland on 16 December but they were forced to cancel this section of the tour because of the 1967 United Kingdom foot-and-mouth outbreak. The Irish government banned them from travelling to Ireland, and the tour schedule was re-arranged. The All Blacks also had to burn all their kit before leaving London at the end of the tour.

Touring party

Management 
Manager: Charles Saxton
Assistant manager: Fred Allen
Captain: Brian Lochore

Full backs 
 Fergie McCormick (Canterbury)

Three-quarters 
 Malcolm Dick (Auckland)
 Bill Birtwistle (Waikato)
 Tony Steel (Canterbury)
 Phil Clarke (Marlborough)
 Grahame Thorne (Auckland)
 Bill Davis (Hawke's Bay)

Five-eighths 
 Ian MacRae (Hawke's Bay)
 Gerald Kember (Wellington)
 Wayne Cottrell (Canterbury)
 Earle Kirton (Otago)
 Mack Herewini (Auckland)

Half backs 
 Chris Laidlaw (Otago)
 Sid Going (North Auckland)

Forwards 
 Ken Gray (Wellington)
 Jack Hazlett (Southland)
 Alister Hopkinson (Canterbury)
 Arthur Jennings (Bay of Plenty)
 Ian Kirkpatrick (Canterbury)
 Brian Lochore (Wairarapa)
 John Major (Taranaki)
 Bruce McLeod (Counties)
 Brian Muller (Taranaki)
 Waka Nathan (Auckland)
 Alan Smith (Taranaki)
 Sam Strahan (Manawatu)
 Kel Tremain (Hawke's Bay)
 Graham Williams (Wellington)
 Murray Wills (Taranaki)
 Colin Meads (King Country)

Match summary 
Scores and results list New Zealand's points tally first.

Match details

England

Wales

France

Scotland

Barbarians

Bibliography

References 

1967 rugby union tours
1967
1967
1967
1967
1967
1967
1967 in New Zealand rugby union
1967–68 in English rugby union
1967–68 in Welsh rugby union
1967–68 in Scottish rugby union
1967–68 in French rugby union
1967 in Canadian sports
1967–68 in European rugby union